In 1917, five years after the death of the founder of the Salvation Army William Booth, his son, General Bramwell Booth, inaugurated the Order of the Founder to recognise Salvationists who had rendered distinguished service, such as would have specially commended itself to the Founder.

The first awards were made in 1920 to 15 officers and one soldier. Three years later, seven officers and one local officer were honoured, but since then the awards have been made much more sparingly and, to date, 104 officers and 106 lay Salvationists have been recognised with the Army's highest honour, a mere 210 in total over 83 years.

The first presentation was to a soldier, Private Herbert Bourne, for outstanding Christian witness and service during military service in the First World War. A few senior leaders like Commissioner T. Henry Howard, General Evangeline Booth and Commissioner Catherine Bramwell-Booth have been picked out but, much more commonly, faithful and devoted service by less well known personalities has been acknowledged. 

Some of the early awards went to people in the United Kingdom, Australia, Indonesia, Russia, France and the United States, but very quickly recipients from Japan, Guyana, Switzerland, Denmark, The Netherlands, China and Norway were picked out. New Zealand has probably had a higher than average recognition for the size of its population, but other territories such as Korea, South America West and Zimbabwe have also been featured.

The honour is rarely given because every nomination is carefully and painstakingly scrutinised by a panel of senior leaders at IHQ. Salvationists have every reason to be proud of those who have been awarded this outstanding recognition for meritorious Christian example, witness and service.

The recipients of the order are:

See also

 List of religion-related awards

References

The Salvation Army
Christian orders, decorations, and medals